Middle Ridge (also called St. Peter's Ridge) is an unincorporated community in the town of Washington in La Crosse County, Wisconsin, United States.

References

External links
History of Middle Ridge

Unincorporated communities in La Crosse County, Wisconsin
Unincorporated communities in Wisconsin